The 9th Micronesian Games were held from July 15 to July 27, 2018, in Yap, Federated States of Micronesia.

Participating nations
Ordinarily, there are 10 participants at the games. However, Nauru were unable to compete in this edition due to travel costs. As such, the participants at the games were: the four constituent states of the Federated States of Micronesia (Chuuk, Kosrae, Pohnpei, Yap), three sovereign countries (Kiribati, Marshall Islands, Palau) and two insular areas of the United States (Northern Mariana Islands, Guam) all located within the Micronesia region.

Sports
Athletes competed in 13 different sports at the games: athletics, baseball, basketball, beach volleyball, the "Micronesian all-around", open water swimming, soccer, spearfishing, 
va'a, table tennis, volleyball, weightlifting, and wrestling.

Previously at the 2014 games 14 sports were contested. However, this edition of the games saw the removal of softball and tennis and the inclusion of beach volleyball.

Medal table
Despite Nauru's withdrawal from the games, individual athlete Jonah Harris was still able to win 5 medals. The final medal table is as follows:

Medalists

Athletics
Men

Women

Baseball

Basketball

Beach volleyball

Micronesian all-around

Open water swimming

Soccer

Spearfishing

Table tennis

Va'a

Volleyball

Weightlifting
Men

Women

Wrestling

References

Micro
Micronesian Games
2018
Micro
International sports competitions hosted by the Federated States of Micronesia
July 2018 sports events in Oceania